Alfonso Darío Pereyra Bueno (born 19 October 1956) is a Uruguayan former football player. Having played as a midfielder for Club Nacional de Football in his home country, he reached stardom playing for São Paulo FC as a centre-back along with Oscar. He is still remembered and revered as one of the best centre-backs in the history of Brazilian football.

Legend has it that, whilst returning from a victory in an away match that crowned São Paulo the Brazilian champions, he wouldn't understand what the fuss was all about, but the supporters would not let him sleep. He had won a few times the national championship in Uruguay, so he felt that winning the Brazilian championship was nothing special. He latter realized how difficult it is to win a Brazilian National title. It had been the first time São Paulo F.C. won that championship.

Career

Playing career
Darío Pereyra started his career at the Nacional de Montevideo and debuted at the Uruguay national squad when he was only 18, becoming the captain of the national team at 19. After having scored 14 goals in 34 matches for the Nacional, São Paulo F.C. hired him on 17 October 1977 for 5 million cruzeiros, the second largest sum to be ever paid for a player at the time in Brazil. He arrived at the Congonhas airport wearing a São Paulo jersey, and was received warmly by the supporters of that team. Pereyra was not able to play immediately after his arrival, for he did not have the necessary documentation to do so. In December 1977, Real Madrid C.F. made an offer that could have cut his São Paulo career short, but the player was not interested in playing in Spain at that particular time.

Throughout his time at São Paulo, he and Oscar, who was also a centre-back, became a line of defence that is frequently remembered as one of the best in that club's history. He played a total of 451 matches in that club, scoring 38 goals. After the 1988 São Paulo state championship, Pereyra has transferred to Flamengo, where he played only 11 matches. After that, he was hired by Palmeiras in early 1989, when he was already 32. In the following year, he played for two years at Gamba Osaka, then called Matsushita Electronic, where he would end his playing career.

Darío Pereyra also made regular appearances in the Uruguay national team, and has played in the 1986 FIFA World Cup.

Managerial career
Darío was an assistant manager at São Paulo when he took over the interim manager position in 1997, succeeding manager Muricy Ramalho. Under his management, São Paulo shook off a weak campaign in the São Paulo State Championship, but the team only obtained the vice-championship title and a 13th position in the Campeonato Brasileiro. After 1998, Pereyra was replaced by manager Nelsinho Baptista.

On 3 October 1998, Pereyra was the fifth manager to take up Coritiba in that very year. However, he managed to lead the team to six victories and five draws in 13 matches. At the end of the 1998 Brazilian championship, he managed Atlético Mineiro, where he eventually obtained the Minas Gerais State Championship in 1999.

Personal life
Pereyra is currently employed by football marketing company Traffic in Brazil as a supervisor responsible for discovering talented, young football players.

Director of Football
2007: Avaí

References

1956 births
Living people
Association football defenders
Club Nacional de Football players
São Paulo FC players
São Paulo FC managers
Uruguayan footballers
Uruguayan expatriate footballers
CR Flamengo footballers
Uruguay international footballers
1986 FIFA World Cup players
Uruguayan Primera División players
Japan Soccer League players
Expatriate footballers in Brazil
Expatriate footballers in Japan
Uruguayan expatriate sportspeople in Brazil
Uruguayan expatriate sportspeople in Japan
Expatriate football managers in Brazil
Guarani FC managers
Sport Club Corinthians Paulista managers
Coritiba Foot Ball Club managers
Grêmio Foot-Ball Porto Alegrense managers
Associação Portuguesa de Desportos managers
Clube Atlético Mineiro managers
Paysandu Sport Club managers
Vila Nova Futebol Clube managers
Uruguayan football managers